Raguenet may refer to:

 Nicolas-Jean-Baptiste Raguenet (1715–1793), French painter
 François Raguenet (1660–1722), French historian